Stitchers is an American science fiction crime drama series created by Jeffrey Alan Schechter.  The series follows Kirsten (Emma Ishta), who has been recruited into a government agency to be "stitched" into the memories of people recently deceased to investigate murders and mysteries that otherwise would have gone unsolved. Cameron (Kyle Harris), a brilliant neuroscientist, assists Kirsten in the secret program headed by Maggie (Salli Richardson-Whitfield),  a skilled covert operator. The program also includes Linus (Ritesh Rajan) a bioelectrical engineer and communications technician. Camille (Allison Scagliotti), Kirsten's roommate and a computer science graduate student, is also recruited to assist Kirsten as a "stitcher".

The series premiered on June 2, 2015, on ABC Family.  In an October 2016 Facebook Live chat, it was announced that the series was renewed for a third season. On September 15, 2017, Freeform canceled the series after three seasons. A total of 31 episodes of Stitchers were produced ending on August 14, 2017.

Series overview

Episodes

Season 1 (2015)

Season 2 (2016)

Season 3 (2017)

References

External links
 
 

Lists of American crime drama television series episodes
Lists of American science fiction television series episodes